Anne Bennett may refer to:

Annabelle Bennett (born 1950), judge of the Federal Court of Australia
Anna Maria Bennett ( 1750–1808), English novelist
Anna Bennett (field hockey) (born 1976), English field hockey player